The Priesener Formation is a Coniacian geologic formation in the Czech Republic. Dinosaur remains diagnostic to the genus level are among the fossils that have been recovered from the formation.

Fossil content 
 Albisaurus scutifer (?Dinosaur indet)

See also 
 List of fossiliferous stratigraphic units in Czech Republic
 List of stratigraphic units with few dinosaur genera

References

Bibliography 
 Weishampel, David B.; Dodson, Peter; and Osmólska, Halszka (eds.): The Dinosauria, 2nd, Berkeley: University of California Press. 861 pp. .

Further reading 
 A. Fritsch. 1905. Neue Reptilien aus der böhmischen Kreideformation [New reptiles from the Bohemian Cretaceous formation]. In A. Fritsch & F. Bayer (ed.), Neue Fische und Reptilien aus der Böhmischen Kreideformation [New Fishes and Reptiles from the Bohemian Cretaceous Formation] 13-34

Geologic formations of the Czech Republic
Upper Cretaceous Series of Europe
Coniacian Stage